William Heneage Ogilvie K.B.E., M.Ch., F.R.C.S. (July 14, 1887 – April 15, 1971) was an accomplished British surgeon, medical essayist, and yachtsman.

Early life

Ogilvie was born in Valparaiso, on 14 July 1887 during his British father's engineering career in Chile. In 1910, he attended Clifton College and New College, Oxford pursuing physiology. He then attended Guy's Hospital for his medical training and obtained his FRCS by 1920.

Later life

A great deal of Ogilvie's adult life was spent in the British Army, where he served in the Balkan Wars in 1912, the first world war in France, and finally as a consulting surgeon with the Middle East and East Africa Forces in the second world war, attaining the rank of Major-General and KBE.

Ogilvie favoured a low-carbohydrate high-fat diet. He wrote the foreword for Richard Mackarness' book Eat Fat and Grow Slim in 1958.

Personal life

Ogilvie married Vere Quitter in 1915 and raised three children.

Selected publications

Surgery, Orthodox and Heterodox (1948) 
No Miracles Among Friends (1959)
The Tired Business Man (1964)

See also

Ogilvie syndrome

References

1887 births
1971 deaths
Alumni of New College, Oxford
British medical writers
British surgeons
Fellows of the Royal College of Surgeons
Low-carbohydrate diet advocates
Physicians of Guy's Hospital
British expatriates in Chile